The Foreman–Roberts House, formerly the James D. Roberts House and now also known as the Foreman–Roberts House Museum, is a historic house and museum located at 1217 N. Carson St. in Carson City, Nevada.  The house was built in 1859 and was moved to the present location in 1873.  Known also as the Thurman Roberts House for the last member of the Roberts family, it is listed on the National Register of Historic Places. It is the headquarters of the Carson City Historical Society and is open to the public by appointment and for special events.

The house was listed on the National Register of Historic Places in 1978.  It is significant "as a rare example of the Gothic Revival Style of architecture", being the only surviving example in Carson City and one of few in Nevada.  It is also the oldest surviving house in Carson City.

The house was documented by drawings in the Historic American Buildings Survey program in 1973.

See also
List of the oldest buildings in Nevada

References

External links
Carson City Historical Society - official site

Houses on the National Register of Historic Places in Nevada
Gothic Revival architecture in Nevada
Houses completed in 1859
Museums in Carson City, Nevada
Historic American Buildings Survey in Nevada
National Register of Historic Places in Carson City, Nevada
Historic house museums in Nevada
Houses in Carson City, Nevada